Archichlora phyllobrota is a species of moth of the  family Geometridae. It is found in central Africa and it is known from Gabon, Cameroon and Congo.

References
Holland, W. J. 1920. Lepidoptera of the Congo. Bulletin of the American Museum of Natural History 43:109–369, pls. 6–14

Geometrinae
Insects of the Democratic Republic of the Congo
Moths of Africa
Moths described in 1920